Ezekial Dann Florek (born May 1, 1950) is an American actor and film director. He is best known for his role as New York City Police Captain Donald Cragen on NBC's Law & Order and its spinoff Law & Order: Special Victims Unit, and Dave Meyer on L.A. Law (1988–1993).

Early life
Florek was born in Flat Rock, Michigan, the son of Leonard Florek, a chiropractor, and Darlene Florek. He attended Eastern Michigan University where he majored in math and physics, but never graduated. He moved to New York City to pursue an acting career in the theatre.

Career

Florek worked his way into supporting roles in such diverse 1980s films as Sweet Liberty, Moon Over Parador and Angel Heart.  He also played Mr. Slate in the live-action film version of The Flintstones.

Florek played Dave Meyer, the husband of Susan Ruttan's character, Roxanne Melman, on 22 episodes of NBC's hit drama L.A. Law beginning in 1988.  Florek also had a recurring role in the WB sitcom Smart Guy as the high school gym coach, and appeared in several episodes of Roseanne.

Law & Order
Starting in 1990, Florek co-starred in the NBC police procedural and legal drama television series Law & Order as Capt. Don Cragen.

The first few years of Law & Order had mediocre ratings and finally, after the close of the 1992–1993 season, NBC told creator/executive producer Dick Wolf that they would cancel the low-rated show unless he added a few women to the all-male cast. Wolf reluctantly complied and fired Florek as well as Richard Brooks (who played Paul Robinette), replacing them with S. Epatha Merkerson and Jill Hennessy, respectively. However, Florek was allowed to direct a few Law & Order episodes in 1994 and 1995.

Florek reprised the role of Cragen in the 1995 episode "Bad Faith" (which he also directed), and in the 1998 TV-movie Exiled, centered on former L&O star Chris Noth's character, Mike Logan. In 1999 he returned to the Cragen role, only this time on the Law & Order spin-off series Law & Order: Special Victims Unit, as the titular unit's captain. Florek was written out of the series during its 15th season, and his final episode aired on January 15, 2014. He reprised his role in the 21st episode of season 16 in May 2015.  In the 500th episode of SVU, he video chatted with the current captain of the unit, Olivia Benson. He also reprised the role of Cragen in an episode of the SVU spin-off Law & Order: Organized Crime, reuniting Cragen with his former detective Elliot Stabler in April 2022. He subsequently appeared in the 2nd season finale.

Personal life
Florek and his wife, Karen, live in Venice, Los Angeles. Karen works as an artist. His brother, Dave, is also an actor. All three trained at Eastern Michigan University.

Florek received an honorary Bachelor of Arts and an honorary Doctorate of Arts, on December 13, 2008, and December 14, 2008, respectively, from Eastern Michigan University at the school's winter commencement ceremony.  Florek was the keynote speaker at the event.

Filmography

Film

Television

References

External links

1950 births
Living people
People from Flat Rock, Michigan
American male film actors
American male television actors
Eastern Michigan University alumni
Male actors from Michigan